Joo Jeong-hun (born 13 February 1994) is a South Korean para taekwondo practitioner. He won one of the bronze medals in the men's 75 kg event at the 2020 Summer Paralympics in Tokyo, Japan.

References

Living people
1994 births
Place of birth missing (living people)
South Korean male taekwondo practitioners
Taekwondo practitioners at the 2020 Summer Paralympics
Medalists at the 2020 Summer Paralympics
Paralympic bronze medalists for South Korea
Paralympic medalists in taekwondo
21st-century South Korean people